Sheik or Sheikh, literally "elder" in Arabic, is the honorific title for the ruler of a tribe.

Sheik or The Sheik may also refer to:

Arts and entertainment
 The Sheik (novel) a 1919 novel by Edith Maude Hull
 The Sheik (film), a 1921 silent film starring Rudolph Valentino, based on the novel
 The Son of the Sheik, a 1926 sequel to the earlier film also starring Rudolph Valentino
 She's a Sheik, a 1927 film starring Bebe Daniels with a gender-reversed plot
 "Sheik", a 1973 song on ZZ Top's album Tres Hombres
 Sheik (Legend of Zelda), an alias/disguise of Princess Zelda, in the 1998 Ocarina of Time
 The Sheik, a character in the 1989 American action comedy movie Speed Zone

People
 Duncan Sheik (born 1969), American singer-songwriter and composer
 Irina Sheik (born 1986), Russian supermodel

Professional wrestlers
 Adnan Al-Kaissie (born 1939), frequently billed as The Sheik
 Ed Farhat (1926–2003), American wrestler who performed as "The Sheik"
 The Sheik II (born 1974), ring name of American wrestler Joseph Cabibbo
 The Iron Sheik (born 1942), ring name of Iranian wrestler Khosrow Vaziri
 Shawn Daivari (born 1984), American wrestler who has performed as "Sheik Abdul Bashir"

Other uses
 Sheik condom, a North American brand of condoms
 Sheiks, Hollywood High School's mascot

See also 
 Chad Morgan (born 1933), Australian singer and comedian commonly referred to as "The Sheik of Scrubby Creek"
 Sheikh (disambiguation)